Tony Kerr (born 21 December 1987 in Sandown) is an English professional footballer who plays for Kitsap Pumas in the USL Premier Development League, and for the English National Beach Soccer team.

Club career
Kerr started playing beach soccer at 14 years of age, fast gaining a reputation as a goalscorer on the English scene after scoring 48 goals in his first season, winning the England Beach Soccer golden foot award. Later, at 16 years old, Kerr again won the EBS golden foot, as well as earning a place in the England Squad and being named English Rookie of the Year.

On 23 April 2009, Kerr was announced to the press as a new signing for the Kitsap Pumas, a brand new professional soccer franchise playing out of Bremerton in the Premier Development League NorthWest Division. Kerr scored the first goal in Kitsap franchise history on 3 May 2009, in a 5–0 win over the Spokane Spiders. He finished his first professional season as Kitsap's second leading points scorer with 7 goals and 2 assists. He started both play-off games as the Pumas eventually lost to eventual PDL National Champions Ventura County Fusion in Laredo, Texas.

At the end of the 2009 season, it was announced that the Pumas would be extending his contract for the 2010 season; he was the first ever player to renew their contract with the club.

International career
Karr has represented England at International level being capped for the Beach Soccer team earning his first call up age 16 and being named English Rookie of the Year.

Kerr returned to the international scene in 2008, scoring the winning penalty in his debut against Estonia in the FIFA Beach Soccer World Cup Qualifiers.

He continued to do well on the International scene, scoring 2 goals in three games against Turkey and Hungary, both during England's largely unsuccessful tour of France.
In 2010, the Forward was named in a ten-man squad to tour the Canary Islands with the England Beach Soccer team after a years absence from the national team. Games included Spain, Switzerland and Germany.

Personal
Tony is the younger brother of FIFA beach soccer coach Luke Kerr.

External links
Sandown Sociedad BSC Profile
England Beach Soccer Team Profile
FIFA Beach Soccer Profile

References

1987 births
Living people
Association football midfielders
English footballers
Kitsap Pumas players
People from Sandown
USL League Two players
East Cowes Victoria Athletic A.F.C. players
English expatriate sportspeople in the United States
Expatriate soccer players in the United States
English expatriate footballers